Guinéenews is a web site solely dedicated to the dissemination of news about the Republic of Guinea. With a staff of five full-time journalists in Conakry and technical and operational support in Canada, Guinéenews is the primary source of information about the current events in Guinea. The site was created in 1997.

In October 2017, Guineenews.org has it 20th anniversary in Conakry. A documentary viewing, a gala at the local hotel with extensive local coverage

External links
Guineenews.org

Guinean news websites